St Keyne Wishing Well Halt railway station is an intermediate station on the scenic Looe Valley Line in Cornwall, United Kingdom. It serves the village of St Keyne and is adjacent to the "Magnificent Music Machines" museum of fairground organs and similar instruments.

History
The Liskeard and Looe Railway was opened on 27 December 1860 to carry goods traffic; passenger trains started on 11 September 1879.  The railway in those days connected only with the Liskeard and Caradon Railway at Moorswater. The link from Coombe Junction to Liskeard railway station opened on 25 February 1901 and St Keyne station opened in October 1902.

Naming

It is one of only two stations in the December 2009 official National Rail Timetable (table 140) to have the suffix "halt": the other is Coombe Junction on the same line. The term "halt" was removed from British Rail timetables and station signs and other official documents by 1974: the return of the term came in 1978 for the opening of IBM Halt in Scotland and in the renaming of these two stations in 2008.

The station name is rendered on tickets as merely 'St Keyne'.

Facilities
The only facilities are a small waiting shelter and information boards, including timetable posters. There are no ticket buying facilities, so passengers have to buy a ticket in advance or from the guard on the train.

Services

This means that passengers alighting here must tell the conductor that they wish to do so, and those waiting to join must signal clearly to the driver as the train approaches. There is no Sunday service in the winter.

Community rail
The railway between Liskeard and Looe is designated as community rail and is supported by marketing provided by the Devon and Cornwall Rail Partnership.

The line is promoted as the "Looe Valley Line".

References

External links

Railway stations in Cornwall
Former Liskeard and Looe Railway stations
Railway stations in Great Britain opened in 1902
Railway stations served by Great Western Railway
Railway request stops in Great Britain
DfT Category F2 stations